Waldegrave Islands is an island group  in the Australian state of South Australia located in the Investigator Group about  northwest by west of Cape Finniss on the west coast of Eyre Peninsula.  The group consists of Waldegrave Island, Little Waldegrave Island and according to some sources, a pair of rocks known as the Watchers.  The group is notable as a breeding site for Australian sea lions and Cape Barren geese.  The group has enjoyed protected area status since the 1960s and as of 1972 has been part of the Waldegrave Islands Conservation Park.

Description

The group consist of the following islands: Waldegrave Island (also called East Waldegrave Island and East Island in some sources), Little Waldegrave Island (also called West Waldegrave Island, West Island and Seal Island in some sources) and according to some sources, a pair of rocks known as the Watchers.

Both islands can be accessed via the rocky coast on their northern sides which is sheltered from southerly swells.

Waldegrave Island
It overlaps the seaward boundary of Anxious Bay as proclaimed by the Australian government in 1987 and again in 2006 under the Seas and Submerged Lands Act 1973.

Little Waldegrave Island

The Watchers
The eastern rock is charted  chart as an intertidal reef.

Formation, geology and oceanography
The Waldegrave Islands were formed about 6000 years ago following the rise of sea levels at the start of the Holocene.  
The Waldegrave Islands are considered to be ‘remnants of a once more prominent Cape Finnis(s)’ with the ‘remains of the bridging isthmus lie as a submerged reef connecting Cape Finnis(s)’ to Waldegrave Island at its north-eastern tip.

The Watchers are reported geologically as being ‘two isolated outcrops of crystalline rocks’.

Its east coast drops into water of depths between  due to the presence of the submerged reef structure between it and Cape Finniss.

The Watchers are associated with a submerged reef system independent of that underlying the Waldegrave and Little Waldegrave Islands.

Flora and fauna

Flora
A survey carried out during 1979 on Waldegrave Island found 26 species of plant that occurred in the following ‘five distinctive groupings’: introduced pasture, ‘heavy infestations of African Boxthorn and native shrublands of native juniper and coast daisy-bush and saltbush.
A survey carried out in 1980 on Little Waldegrave Island found southern seaheath, sea celery and nine other species of plant including ‘colonising weeds such as African boxthorn and common iceplant’.

Fauna
A Survey carried out during 1979 on Waldegrave Island found the following species of birds: short-tailed shearwater, Cape Barren geese, masked plover, galah, white-fronted chat, little grassbird, Nankeen kestrel, black-faced shag, sooty oystercatcher, white-bellied sea eagle, various gulls and terns, and barn owl which prey on the population of bush rat.
A survey carried out in 1980 on Little Waldegrave Island found a population of Australian sea lions and five species of birds including rock parrot, Cape Barren geese and little penguin.  
Surveys carried out on Little Waldegrave Island between February 2001 and May 2006 confirm the presence of the following bird species: white-faced heron, eastern reef egret, white-bellied sea eagle, swamp harrier, peregrine falcon, Nankeen kestrel, common greenshank, ruddy turnstone, red-necked stint, masked lapwing, rock parrot, sacred kingfisher, white-fronted chat, Australian raven, Richard's pipit, welcome swallow, silvereye and common starling.

Australian sea lion
Little Waldegrave Island is the site of a breeding colony of Australian sea lion.  As of 1999, the population was reported as being 38. On the larger island, Flinders' expedition killed "a few" Australian sea lions.

Cape Barren geese
As of 1996, the Waldegrave Islands were considered to be the ’second most important breeding area’ for Cape Barren geese in South Australia and as having a breeding population of 20 pairs.  As of 1999, the geese were reported as having a population of 350 and as staying ‘in the Elliston area for the summer, feeding in swamps around the margins of Lake Newland and on grain in wheat paddocks’.

Little penguin
The Waldegrave Islands have been reported as the site of a little penguin breeding colony.  As of 1999, 300 pairs were reported in 1996 as being present on Waldegrave Island.  As of 2006, the populations on Waldegrave and Little Waldegrave Islands were estimated as being respectively 600 in 2006 and as being ‘common’ in 1979.

History

European discovery and use
Matthew Flinders named the island group after William Waldegrave, 1st Baron Radstock on Wednesday, 10 February 1802.

The Waldegrave Islands is one of the island sites from which guano was mined under licence from the South Australian Government prior to 1919.

Prior to 1967, Waldegrave Island was used for grazing.

Protected areas status

The Waldegrave Islands first received protected area status as a fauna conservation reserve declared on 16 March 1967.  The Waldegrave Islands along with the Watchers were proclaimed as a conservation park under the National Parks and Wildlife Act 1972 in 1972.

See also
List of islands of Australia
List of little penguin colonies
Investigator Islands Important Bird Area

Citations and references

Citations

References
	

  

   

Islands of South Australia
Uninhabited islands of Australia
Great Australian Bight